Ingvar Even Ambjørnsen-Haefs (born 20 May 1956) is a Norwegian writer. He is best known for his "Elling" tetralogy: Utsikt til paradiset (1993), Fugledansen (1995), Brødre i blodet (1996), and Elsk meg i morgen (1999).

Brødre i blodet ("Blood brothers") was turned into a successful movie, entitled Elling, which received an Oscar nomination in the Best Foreign Film category in 2001. The English translation of the novel is called Beyond the Great Indoors.

Born in Tønsberg and raised in Larvik, his semi-autobiographical debut novel 23-salen ("The 23rd Row"), criticized mental health care in Norway. All of his novels take the side of the outsider, including his break-through novel Hvite Niggere ("White Niggers", 1986). The novel is about a young man who leads a life somewhat on the edges of normal society.

He is also known for his series for young people "Pelle og Proffen" which focuses on two teenage detectives who get involved in many mysteries and crimes involving drugs, pollution and neo-Nazism among other things. He started this project after reading some of Franklin W. Dixon's books about The Hardy Boys. The books Døden på Oslo S, Giftige Løgner, and De Blå Ulvene of this series were also turned into successful movies. In 2005 the book Drapene i Barkvik ("The murders in Barkvik") appeared, about the teenager Fillip Moberg attempting to solve an axe murder in a small Norwegian village.

In 2010 Ambjørnsen stopped writing novels; Farvel til romanen. 24 timer i grenseland, published in 2014, is about that decision and about how he came to write his novels.

Ambjørnsen has received many prizes for his writing. Among them are the Norwegian Booksellers Association's prize for the best book of the 1980s for children and young adults (Pelle and Proffen books), the Tabu prize in 2001, the Telenor Culture Award in 2002, and the Brage Prize in 1995.

His three Samson and Roberto books have become particularly popular in Russia, in part due to the illustrations by Nikolay Vorontsov, which also contribute carefully orchestrated local Russian-related colloquialisms to the stories.

Until 2014, Ambjørnsen frequently reviewed books for the Norwegian newspaper VG. Since 1985 he has lived in Hamburg with his German wife and translator, Gabriele Haefs. In 2009 he was made an honorary citizen of Larvik.

Bibliography

Novels
23-salen (1981)
Den siste revejakta (1983, crime novel)
 (1987)
Brødre i blodet (1996)

References

1956 births
Living people
20th-century Norwegian novelists
21st-century Norwegian novelists
Norwegian children's writers
Norwegian crime fiction writers
People from Larvik
Writers from Tønsberg
Norwegian expatriates in Germany